The Italian Catholic Archdiocese of Rossano–Cariati in Calabria has existed since 597, beginning as the Diocese of Rossano. It is a suffragan of the Archdiocese of Cosenza-Bisignano.

History
In 597, the Diocese of Rossano was established from the former Diocese of Thurio.

In 982 Emperor Otto II captured Rossano temporarily from the Byzantines, who had made it the capital of their possessions in Southern Italy. It preserved its Greek character long after its conquest by the Normans.

The first known bishop of this see is Valerianus, Bishop of the "Ecclesia Rosana" in the Roman Council of 680. Cappelletti, however, names a certain Saturninus as first bishop.

In 1460, the Diocese was elevated to an Archdiocese immediately subject to the Holy See.

On Juni 27, 1818, with the bull De utiliori of Pope Pius VII, the dioceses of Cerenzia, Strongoli and Umbriatico were incorporated in the Diocese of Cariati.

The famous Codex Rossanensis was discovered in 1879 in the cathedral sacristy, see Batiffol (below).

On February 13, 1919, the Diocese had territory transferred to create the Eparchy of Lungro for the Italo-Albanian Catholic Church. On April 4, 1979, the Archdiocese was merged with the Diocese of Cariati to become the Archdiocese of Rossano e Cariati. On September 9, 1986, the Archdiocese was renamed to Archdiocese of Rossano–Cariati On January 30, 2001, the Archdiocese of Cosenza-Bisignano was elevated to a Metropolitan See with Rossano-Cariati as a suffragan diocese.

Rite
In the tenth century, or perhaps earlier, the Greek Rite was introduced at Rossano, and continued until the sixteenth century, although two attempts were made to introduce the Latin Rite – once in 1092, and again by Bishop Matteo de' Saraceni in 1460. Priests of the Latin Rite, however, were often appointed bishops. The Greek Rite was maintained especially by the seven Basilian monasteries in the diocese, the most famous of which was Santa Maria in Patiro. In 1571 the Greek Rite was abandoned in the cathedral, and half a century afterwards throughout the city.

Bishops
Among the prominent archbishops were:

Juan Rodríguez de Fonseca (1519–1524), architect of the colonization of New Spain;
Vincenzo Pimpinella (1525), nuncio to Germany;
Giovanni Battista Castagna (1553), afterwards Pope Urban VII;
Lucio Sanseverino;
Pier Antonio Spinelli (1628) and Jacopo Carafa (1646), both of whom restored and embellished the cathedral.

Ordinaries

Diocese of Rossano
Latin Name: RossanensisErected: 7th Century

Angelo  (1429–1433 Appointed Archbishop (Personal Title) of Tricarico)
Stefano Carrara (1433–1434 Died)
Antonio Roda (1434–1442 Resigned)
Nicola de Martino (1442–1447 Died)
Giacomo Della Ratta (1447–1451 Appointed, Archbishop of Benevento)
Domenico de Lagonessa, O.S.B. (1452–1459 Died)

Archdiocese of Rossano
Latin Name: RossanensisElevated:  1460

Matteo de Saraceni, O.F.M. (1460–1481 Died)
Nicola Ippoliti (September 5, 1481 – January 13, 1493 Appointed Archbishop (Personal Title) of Città di Castello) 
Giovanni Battista Lagni (January 18, 1493 – 1500 Died) 
Bernardino López de Carvajal y Sande, Apostolic Administrator (January 10, 1508 – June 20, 1519 Resigned) 
Juan Rodríguez de Fonseca (June 20, 1519 – November 12, 1524 Died) 
Vincenzo Pimpinella (July 3, 1525 – November 3, 1534 Died) 
Francesco Colonna (December 18, 1534 – October 22, 1544 Appointed Archbishop of Taranto) 
Girolamo Verallo (November 14, 1544 – 1551 Resigned) 
Paolo Emilio Verallo (April 22, 1551 – March 1, 1553 Appointed Archbishop (Personal Title) of Capaccio) 
Giovanni Battista Castagna (March 1, 1553 – Jan 1573 Resigned) 
Lancillotto Lancellotti (January 23, 1573 – 1580 Died) 
Lelio Giordano (November 28, 1580 – 1581 Died) 
Silvio Savelli (January 26, 1582 – 1589 Resigned) 
Scipione Floccaro (July 17, 1589 – September 26, 1592 Died) 
Lucio Sanseverino (December 2, 1592 – November 19, 1612 Appointed Archbishop of Salerno) 
Mario Sassi (November 26, 1612 – January 9, 1615 Died) 
Girolamo Pignatelli, CR (May 18, 1615 – December 22, 1618 Died)
Ercole Vaccari (February 18, 1619 – July 27, 1624 Died) 
Paolo Torelli (October 7, 1624 – 1629 Resigned) 
Pietro Antonio Spinelli (May 28, 1629 – December 9, 1645 Died) 
Giacomo Carafa (October 18, 1646 – April 7, 1664 Died) 
Carlo Spinola, OSM (September 15, 1664 – January 6, 1671 Died) 
Angelo della Noca, OSB (March 18, 1671 – December 14, 1675 Resigned)
Girolamo Orsaja, OM (February 24, 1676 – June 13, 1683 Died)
Girolamo Compagnone (February 5, 1685 – November 1, 1687 Died)
Andrea de Rossi, CR (May 31, 1688 – October 30, 1696 Died)
Andrea Deodati, OSB (July 1, 1697 – August 7, 1713 Died)
Francesco Maria Muscettola, CR (December 6, 1717 – April 16, 1738 Resigned)
Stanislao Poliastri (May 21, 1738 – December 30, 1761 Resigned) 
Guglelmo Camaldari (March 29, 1762 – April 22, 1778 Died) 
Andrea Cardamone (July 20, 1778 – May 29, 1800 Died) 
Gaetano Paolo de Miceli, C.P.O. (October 29, 1804 – October 22, 1813 Died) 
Carlo Puoti (April 6, 1818 – July 3, 1826 Confirmed Archbishop (Personal Title) of Alife) 
Salvatore de Luca (April 9, 1827 – April 28, 1833 Died) 
Bruno Maria Tedeschi (April 6, 1835 – January 19, 1843 Died) 
Pietro Cilento (July 22, 1844 – March 21, 1885 Died) 
Salvatore Palmieri, C.Pp.S. (May 24, 1889 – November 24, 1891 Resigned) 
Donato Maria Dell'Olio (December 14, 1891 – February 5, 1898 Appointed Archbishop of Benevento) 
Orazio Mazzella (March 24, 1898 – April 14, 1917 Appointed Archbishop of Taranto) 
Giovanni Scotti (December 13, 1918 – October 16, 1930 Died) 
Domenico Marsiglia (May 28, 1931 – May 20, 1948 Died) 
Giovanni Rizzo (January 13, 1949 – November 18, 1971 Retired) 
Antonio Cantisani (November 18, 1971 – July 31, 1980 Appointed Archbishop of Catanzaro)

Archdiocese of Rossano e Cariati
Latin Name: Rossanensis et Cariatensis United: April 4, 1979
 
Serafino Sprovieri (July 31, 1980 – November 25, 1991 Appointed Archbishop of Benevento)
Andrea Cassone (March 26, 1992 – May 6, 2006 Retired) 
Santo Marcianò (May 6, 2006 – October 10, 2013 Appointed Archbishop of Italy, Military) 
Giuseppe Satriano (July 15, 2014 – October 29, 2020 Appointed Archbishop of Bari-Bitonto)
Maurizio Aloise (March 20, 2021 – present)

Diocese of Turio
The archdiocese includes the ancient Diocese of Turio (Thurii), a city which arose after the destruction of Sybaris; five of its bishops are known, the first being Giovanni (501) and the last Guglielmo (1170).

See also
Abbazia del Patire

References

Notes
 Cappelletti, Le Chieze d'Italia, XXI;
 Battifol, L'abbaye de Rossano (Paris, 1891)
 Gay, Les dioceses de Calabre a l'epoque byzantine (Macon, 1900)

Roman Catholic dioceses in Calabria
Dioceses established in the 6th century